The Scharteberg is a mountain,  high, near Kirchweiler in the district of Vulkaneifel and is one of the highest peaks in the Eifel region of Germany. On the summit is the Eifel Transmitter which belongs to SWR and is used for FM radio and television.

References 

Mountains under 1000 metres
Mountains and hills of the Eifel
Mountains and hills of Rhineland-Palatinate
Vulkaneifel
Natural monuments in Rhineland-Palatinate